Burgenland – Saalekreis is an electoral constituency (German: Wahlkreis) represented in the Bundestag. It elects one member via first-past-the-post voting. Under the current constituency numbering system, it is designated as constituency 73. It is located in southern Saxony-Anhalt, comprising the Burgenlandkreis distinct and eastern parts of the Saalekreis district.

Burgenland – Saalekreis was created for the inaugural 1990 federal election after German reunification. Since 2009, it has been represented by Dieter Stier of the Christian Democratic Union (CDU).

Geography
Burgenland – Saalekreis is located in southern Saxony-Anhalt. As of the 2021 federal election, it comprises the entirety of the Burgenlandkreis district and the municipalities of Bad Dürrenberg, Braunsbedra, Leuna, and Schkopau from Saalekreis district.

History
Burgenland – Saalekreis was created after German reunification in 1990, then known as Zeitz – Hohenmölsen – Naumburg – Nebra. In the 2002 and 2005 elections, it was named Burgenland. It acquired its current name in the 2009 election. In the 1990 through 1998 elections, it was constituency 294 in the numbering system. In the 2002 through 2009 elections, it was number 74. Since the 2013 election, it has been number 73.

Originally, it comprised the districts of Zeitz, Hohenmölsen, Naumburg, and Nebra. It acquired its current borders in the 2002 election.

Members
The constituency was first represented by Harald Schreiber of the Christian Democratic Union (CDU) from 1990 to 1994, followed by Margarete Späte from 1994 to 1998. It was won by the Social Democratic Party (SPD) in 1998, and Eckhart Lewering served until 2005, followed by Maik Reichel until 2009. Dieter Stier of the CDU was elected in 2009, and re-elected in 2013, 2017, and 2021.

Election results

2021 election

2017 election

2013 election

2009 election

References

Federal electoral districts in Saxony-Anhalt
1990 establishments in Germany
Constituencies established in 1990